Sam Schröder defeated Dylan Alcott in the final, 7–6(7–5), 0–6, 6–4 to win the quad singles wheelchair tennis title at the 2020 US Open. Schröder had entered the tournament as a wildcard.

Andy Lapthorne was the defending champion, but was eliminated in the round-robin stage.

Seeds

Draw

Final

Round robin
Standings are determined by: 1. number of wins; 2. number of matches; 3. in two-players-ties, head-to-head records; 4. in three-players-ties, percentage of sets won, or of games won; 5. steering-committee decision.

References

External links
 Draw

Wheelchair Quad Singles
U.S. Open, 2020 Quad Singles